X Cancri is a variable star in the northern constellation of Cancer. It has a red hue and is visible to the naked eye at its brightest. The distance to this object is approximately 1,860 light years based on parallax measurements, but is drifting closer with a radial velocity of −5 km/s. It lies very close to the ecliptic and so is subject to lunar occultations.

This object is a carbon staran aging red giant star on the asymptotic giant branch that has a higher abundance of carbon than oxygen in its atmosphereand is one of the brightest carbon stars in the sky. It has a carbon star spectral classification of C-N4.5 C25.5 MS3.  The first C indicates that it is a carbon star, and the N5 that it is a fairly cool strongly red AGB star. The C2 index indicates the strength of the Swan bands on a scale of one to eight, which shows the relative abundance of carbon vs oxygen.  The MS index, not to be confused with an MS spectral class, indicates the strength of the SiC2 bands on a scale of one to seven.  These bands are thought to be very sensitive to temperature.

This is a semiregular variable star of subtype SRb that ranges in brightness from visual magnitude 5.52 down to 7.50 with a period of 193 days.  Fourier analysis has shown that the star also pulsates with periods of 350 and 1,870 days.

References

Carbon stars
Asymptotic-giant-branch stars
Semiregular variable stars

Cancer (constellation)
Durchmusterung objects
076221
043811
3541
Cancri, X